V. N. Sundaram (1918-2009) was an Indian Stage and Film actor, Carnatic singer and Playback singer who sang mostly in Tamil-language films.

Early life 
Born in 1918 in Visalur - a village in Kumbakonam Taluk of Thanjavur district, he was named AlasyaSundaram.

As a boy he listened to Nadaswaram music during temple festivals and had the ability to repeat the Ragas by voice.
 
He joined Nataraja Gana Saba, a boys' stage troupe, as an actor at the age of 12. But he had to leave the place within 6 months. He was a strict vegetarian. But in the troupe Veg and Non-veg food were cooked. He could not tolerate this and left the troupe.

He then joined the Madurai Bala Vinodha Sangeetha Sabha, another boys' stage drama troupe. He was trained by Yadhartham Ponnusamy Pillai and was given Raja part in his 3rd stage play. That play, Paduka Pattabhishekam was a hit. In order to limit space in the poster, his name was written as V. N. Sundaram. Then onwards he was known by that name.

Actor in films 
His first film was Markandeya released in 1935. He was featured in the title role. Papanasam Sivan composed the song paraat paraa in the raga Vachaspathi and Sundaram sang that song. It was a hit. Later M. S. Subbulakshmi sang the song and made it popular.

Pattinathar (1936) film featured M. M. Dandapani Desikar in the title role. Sundaram acted as Pattinathar's son, Marudhavanan.
Sundaram acted in the title roles in Chandrahasan (1936) Sundaramoorthi Nayanar (1937), Kannappa Nayanar (1938) and Sankarachariyar (1939)
His other films are Appoothi Adigal (1941), Rajasooyam (1942) and finally Dhana Amaravati (1947).
After the latter half of the 1940s, films with social themes became the trend. Sundaram, who acted mainly in Puranic films did not get any acting chances. So he shifted on to the music field as a playback singer.

Playback singer 
His first song as playback singer was Sinnanjiru kiliye Kannamma written by Bharathiyar. Music was scored by C. R. Subbaraman. It was a duet and M. L. Vasanthakumari was his co-singer.
From then on he has sung many remarkable songs till 1962.

Filmography

As actor and singer

As Playback singer

Death 
Sundaram died on 14 December 2009 at the age of 92.

References 

1918 births
2009 deaths
Indian male playback singers
Tamil singers
Tamil playback singers
20th-century Indian male classical singers
Singers from Tamil Nadu
Male actors in Tamil cinema
20th-century Indian male actors